Bruno Wojtinek (born 6 March 1963) is a French former professional racing cyclist. He rode in the 1987 Tour de France.

Major results

1981
1st  Overall Tour de l'Abitibi
1983
1st Circuit du Port de Dunkerque
2nd Paris–Roubaix Espoirs
1984
1st GP de la Ville de Rennes
3rd Paris–Tours
1985
1st Overall Tour d'Armorique
1st Stage 1
Settimana Internazionale di Coppi e Bartali
1st Stages 2 & 5
1st Stage 2a Tour de Luxembourg
2nd Overall 4 Jours de Dunkerque
2nd Paris–Roubaix
3rd Chanteloup-les-Vignes 
5th Brabantse Pijl
1986
Paris–Nice
1st Stages 1 & 2
4 Jours de Dunkerque
1st Stages 2 & 3
Tour de Picardie
1st Prologue & Stage 1
1st Stage 4a Critérium du Dauphiné Libéré
1st Stage 5 Route du Sud
1st Stage 3 Tour of Sweden
1st Stage 4 Tour de la Communauté Européenne
1st GP de Denain Porte du Hainaut
5th Milan–San Remo
7th Rund um den Henninger Turm
1987
Route du Sud
1st Prologue & Stage 1
1st Stage 3a Critérium du Dauphiné Libéré
1st Stage 3 Tour du Limousin
1st GP de Denain Porte du Hainaut
5th Overall 4 Jours de Dunkerque
6th Paris–Roubaix
1988
1st Prologue Tour Méditerranéen
3rd Grand Prix de Cannes

References

External links

1963 births
Living people
French male cyclists
Sportspeople from Valenciennes
Cyclists from Hauts-de-France
French people of Polish descent